Denis Bernard may refer to:

 Denis Bernard (actor) (born 1957), Canadian film, television and theater actor and producer
 Denis Bernard (British Army officer) (1882–1956)
 Denis Bernard (Gaelic footballer) (born 1932), Irish former Gaelic footballer